Fallows is a surname. Notable people with the surname include:

 Fearon Fallows (1789–1831), English astronomer
 James Fallows (born 1949), American print and radio journalist
 Samuel Fallows (1835–1922), American clergyman
 Richie Fallows (born 1995), English squash player

See also
 Fallow (disambiguation)